Ge Xiurun (12 July 1934 – 4 January 2023) was a Chinese rock mechanics engineer, and an academician of the Chinese Academy of Engineering.

Biography
Ge was born in Nanhui County (now Nanhui District), Shanghai, on 12 July 1934. He attended the Nanyang Model High School. In 1952, he was accepted to Tsinghua University, where he majored in the Water Conservancy Department. In 1954, he arrived in the Soviet Union to begin his education at the Odesa State Academy of Civil Engineering and Architecture. 

He returned to China after graduation with a vice-doctorate degree and worked in the Central South Institute of Mechanics, Chinese Academy of Sciences, which was reshuffled as the Wuhan Institute of Geotechnical Mechanics later. Between 1981 and 1983, he worked at the Karlsruhe Institute of Technology alongside Leopold Müller. From January 1980 to January 1998, he successively worked as deputy director and then director of the Research Office of Wuhan Institute of Geotechnical Mechanics, Chinese Academy of Sciences. He joined the Chinese Communist Party (CCP) in January 1985.

On 4 January 2023, Ge died at the age of 87.

Honours and awards
 1985 State Science and Technology Progress Award (Special) for the Gezhouba Second and Third Rivers Project and Its Hydropower Units
 1990 State Science and Technology Progress Award (Third Class) for the three dimensional finite element analysis of gravity dam on Qing River considering complex foundation
 1995 Member of the Chinese Academy of Engineering (CAE)

References

1934 births
2023 deaths
Engineers from Shanghai
Nanyang Model High School alumni
Tsinghua University alumni
Academic staff of Shanghai Jiao Tong University
Members of the Chinese Academy of Engineering
20th-century Chinese engineers
21st-century Chinese engineers